Listen to the Message is the second studio album by the American contemporary R&B group Club Nouveau. It was released on May 24, 1988, on Warner Bros. Records. Listen to the Message contains darker lyrics dealing with social consciousness. Members Samuelle Prater and Thomas McElroy left the group before recording and were replaced with David Agent and Kevin Irving.

Critical reception
The Globe and Mail called the album "an ambitious second LP that gets a D for originality, but an A - well, maybe a B+ - for execution." The Orlando Sentinel wrote that "'It's a Cold, Cold World!' -- with well-focused lyrics and a rock-steady beat -- kicks as hard as its opening percussive blast."

Track listing
"It's a Cold, Cold World!" — 4:35
"Listen to the Message" — 5:05
"Dancin' to Be Free" — 4:35
"Why Is It That?" — 5:14
"For the Love of Francis" — 3:35
"Envious" — 4:29 
"What's Going 'Round" — 4:23
"Only the Strong Survive" — 4:57
"Better Way" — 4:27

Charts

References

External links
 Club Nouveau—Listen to the Message  at Discogs

1988 albums
Club Nouveau albums
Warner Records albums